Jean Baptiste Gogain (born November 13, 1858), also known as Jean-Baptiste Goguen or Gueguen, was a Canadian politician. He served in the Legislative Assembly of New Brunswick from 1892 to 1895 and 1903 to 1908 as an Conservative member.

References 

1858 births
Year of death missing